

Board games

Gettysburg (game) (1958)
Terrible Swift Sword (1976)
Battle Cry (game) (2000)
A House Divided (board game) (2001)
Civil War Commander (2010)

Miniatures games
The American Uncivil War (2013)
Enduring Valor: Gettysburg in Miniature (2002)
Glory, Hallelujah! (2016) 
Hardtack (1971)
Johnny Reb (1983)
Ironclad (1973)
Stars and Bars (1979)

Video Games

North & South (1989)
Take Command (2004)
Forge of Freedom: The American Civil War (2006)
The History Channel: Civil War - A Nation Divided (2006)
History Civil War: Secret Missions (2008)
Darkest of Days (2009)
Scourge of War (2010)
Viet-Afghan (2011, Arsenal of Democracy add-on published by FRVP)
Ultimate General (2014, 2016)
War of Rights (2014-Ongoing)
Grand Tactician: The Civil War (1861-1865) (2020-Ongoing)
Battle Cry of Freedom (2022)

American Civil War